My Way Airlines S.r.l., operated as MyAir.com, was a low-cost airline based in Torri di Quartesolo, Vicenza, Italy. It operated scheduled services linking a dozen Italian cities and international flights to France, Romania, Bulgaria, Turkey, Morocco, Spain, Belgium, and the Netherlands. Its main base was Orio al Serio Airport, Bergamo, near Milan, until the Italian Civil Aviation Authority (ENAC) suspended their flights to and from Orio al Serio Airport. On 22 July 2009, ENAC announced a suspension of MyAir's licence, effective 00:01 CEST on 24 July.

History 
The airline was established in 2004 and started operations on 17 December 2004, with three Airbus A320-200s wet-leased from other airlines. The following week, it received its own air operator certificate and started operations with its own Airbus A320-200. It was backed by former Volare Airlines management. Owners included Triskel SRL (51%) and My Holding (23%), and it had 232 employees (at March 2007).

On 21 July 2009, the Italian Civil Aviation Authority (ENAC) suspended MyAir operations from Bergamo-Orio al Serio Airport due to unpaid taxes, duties and tariffs. Flights from Venice Marco Polo Airport and Bari International Airport were also suspended. This suspension was effective 24 July of that year.

MyAir had placed a firm order for 19 Bombardier CRJ-900s, which was announced in September 2006. In February 2007, after four airframes had been delivered, Bombardier announced that the remaining 15 orders had been converted to the CRJ-1000 aircraft. On 11 August 2009, Bombardier announced that it had terminated its firm order purchase agreement with MyAir, with respect to all remaining undelivered aircraft.

On September 3, 2009, it was announced that the company management was in talks with four financial backers, in order to resume operations.

On 2 February 2010, a Vicenza court initiated bankruptcy proceedings.

Destinations

Codeshare agreements 
MyAir.com had the following codeshares agreements (at July 2009):

 Darwin Airline (Geneva, Lugano)

Fleet 

The MyAir historical fleet consisted of the following aircraft:

References

External links

MyAir website
  (archive)
Myair.com Magazine inflight magazine (archive)

Italian companies established in 2004
Italian companies disestablished in 2009
Defunct airlines of Italy
European Low Fares Airline Association
Defunct European low-cost airlines
Airlines established in 2004
Airlines disestablished in 2009